Arctosyrphus is a genus of rat-tail maggot flies in the family Syrphidae. This genus has a single species, Arctosyrphus willingii. It was formerly a member of the genus Lejops.

References

Eristalinae
Monotypic Diptera genera
Hoverfly genera
Insects described in 1912